The town of Mariposa is the capital of the Pampa Hermosa District in Satipo Province, Peru.

See also
 Administrative divisions of Peru

References

Cities in Peru
Populated places in the Junín Region
Regional capital cities in Peru